Boxing at the 1980 Summer Olympics took place at the Indoor Stadium of the Olympiski Sports Complex in Moscow from 20 July to 2 August. Eleven boxing events (all men's individual) were contested with the participation of 271 fighters from 51 countries.

Medalists

Medal table

Participation

References

 
1980
1980 Summer Olympics events
1980 in boxing
International boxing competitions hosted by the Soviet Union